The International Civic Library of Bordighera is at 52 via Romana.

History 

The first library of Bordighera was founded by the British in 1880 and was in the city’s Anglican Church.

In 1910 the British community decided to build a dedicated library on Via Romana to host a growing collection. Funds were gathered by Clarence Bicknell who designed a Victorian stone building with a façade embellished by a semi-circular portico, supported by six columns, and made even more beautiful by the presence of a wisteria now centenary.

After the Second World War, the library was bought by the city of Bordighera and restored in 1985 by the Genoese architect Gianfranco Franchini, particularly known for his work with Renzo Piano at the Centre Pompidou of Paris. The library boasts the title of "International" because it has a collection of about 40,000 volumes in Italian, 20,000 in English, 6,000 in French and 3,000 in German. The library also has a collection of about 950 old digitized photos of the Victorian Bordighera.

Notes

External links 
 Official website of the Bordighera Library
 Old photos

Libraries established in 1910
Libraries in Liguria